Sulfametomidine (or sulfamethomidine) is a sulfonamide antibacterial.

References

Sulfonamide antibiotics
Pyrimidines
Phenol ethers